Salomon Leclercq (15 November 1745 – 2 September 1792) – born Guillaume-Nicolas-Louis Leclercq – was a French friar. Leclercq assumed the religious name Salomon after he made vows in the Institute of the Brothers of the Christian Schools (De La Salle Brothers).

Leclercq was killed in 1792 after he refused to take the oath of allegiance to the new French government almost two weeks before the kingdom was dissolved. He was killed in the garden of a Carmelite convent around a fortnight after he had been arrested and imprisoned in Paris.

His canonization as a martyr was celebrated on 16 October 2016.

Life

Guillaume-Nicolas-Louis Leclercq was born in the Kingdom of France on 15 November 1745.

He entered the novitiate at the Institute of the Brothers of the Christian Schools on 25 March 1767. He served as a teacher and later as the master of novices. Leclercq also was made procurator in 1777 of Maréville and in 1778 made provincial. In 1790, during the French Revolution, the institute was designated as being illegal due to the members who refused to take the oath of allegiance to the new French government following the toppling of King Louis XVI. Leclercq too refused to take the oath and despite being monitored penned letters to his relatives. His last letter was dated on 15 August 1792. It was around this time in 1791 he and the priest Clorivièm initiated plans to establish a new religious congregation – it was never to materialize.

Leclercq was arrested on 15 August 1792 and was imprisoned with priests and other religious at a Carmelite convent in Paris. Revolutionaries armed with swords killed them all on 2 September 1792 in the garden of the convent.

Sainthood
The process for Leclercq's sainthood commenced in Paris on 21 March 1901 in a diocesan process for himself and his fellow 190 compatriots killed at the same time as he. The process was tasked with collating biographical evidence on them and attesting to their being killed in odium fidei ("in hatred of the faith"); the process concluded on 5 February 1906. This occurred despite the fact that the formal introduction to the cause did not occur until it received the approval of Pope Benedict XV on 26 January 1916 in a move that labelled Leclercq as a Servant of God.

The second process later was held and after it concluded received the full ratification of the Congregation of Rites in addition to the first process receiving ratification. This ensured that the cause could proceed to the next stage under the care of officials in Rome. His beatification received formal approval from Pope Pius XI on 1 October 1926; the pontiff beatified Leclercq and his 190 companions on 17 October 1926.

Following this Leclercq's cause was disconnected from his compatriots and treated as a singular cause. The supposed miracle that would lead to his eventual sanctification was investigated in the diocese of its origin in Venezuela from 19 January 2011 to 29 September 2011 and was sent to the Congregation for the Causes of Saints for further investigation. The consulting medical board approved the miracle on 3 March 2016 while theologians approved it the following month on 5 April 2016. The C.C.S. approved the miracle on 3 May 2016 and passed it onto Pope Francis who approved for Leclercq's canonization on 9 May 2016.

The date of canonization was decided at a gathering of cardinals on 20 June 2016 and the canonization itself was celebrated in Saint Peter's Square on 16 October 2016.

References

External links
Hagiography Circle
Saints SQPN

1745 births
1792 deaths
18th-century venerated Christians
French clergy killed in the French Revolution
Beatifications by Pope Pius XI
Canonizations by Pope Francis
Catholic martyrs
French Roman Catholic saints
Lasallian saints
People from Pas-de-Calais
Venerated Catholics